Musso's fish-eating rat (Neusticomys mussoi) is a species of rodent in the family Cricetidae endemic to
western Venezuela, where it has been found at altitudes of 1000 to 1200 m. It is semiaquatic and feeds on freshwater invertebrates.

References

Neusticomys
Mammals described in 1991
Taxonomy articles created by Polbot